A.E. Irakleio F.C is a Greek football club, based in Irakleio, Attica.

The club was founded in 1929. They will play in Gamma Ethniki for the season 2015–16.

Honors

Domestic Titles and honors
 Eps Athens Champions: 1
 2014-15

External links
 https://web.archive.org/web/20190103104445/http://fcirakleio.gr/

Football clubs in Attica
1929 establishments in Greece